Tough as They Come is a 1942 Universal film directed by William Nigh and starring the Dead End Kids and the Little Tough Guys.

Plot
Tommy works for an unethical finance company that charges borrowers extremely high interest that is difficult to pay back. As a result, the company repossesses items such as radios, furniture and cars from their debtors. Tommy believes that the company's practices are unfair and collects evidence to bring to the district attorney's office.

Cast

Dead End Kids and Little Tough Guys
Billy Halop as Tommy Clark
Huntz Hall as Pig
Bernard Punsly as Ape
Gabriel Dell as String

Additional cast
Paul Kelly as Dan Stevens
Helen Parrish as Ann Wilson
Ann Gillis as Frankie Taylor
Virginia Brissac as Mrs. Clark
John Gallaudet as Mike Taylor

Production
Prior to filming, the Production Code Administration declined the original script, stating that it could not be approved because of the "objectionable element which the script contains is the inference, as at presently written, that all finance and installment companies operate in a rather illegal manner as to the details of transacting their business, and in a brutal manner as to the details in making their collections."

References

External links

1942 films
1942 crime films
American black-and-white films
1940s English-language films
American crime films
Films directed by William Nigh
Universal Pictures films
1940s American films